The 2006 Croatia Open Umag was the 17th edition of the Croatia Open Umag men's tennis tournament. The tournament was held on outdoor clay courts from 24 July until 30 July 2006. Guillermo Coria was the defending champion but lost in the first round. Unseeded Stan Wawrinka won his first title of his career after Novak Djokovic retired with breathing problems in the tiebreak of the first set.

Finals

Singles

 Stan Wawrinka defeated  Novak Djokovic, 6–6 RET

Doubles

 Jaroslav Levinský /  David Škoch defeated  Guillermo García López /  Albert Portas, 6–4, 6–4

References

External links
 ITF tournament edition details

Croatia Open
Croatia Open
Croatia Open